Latris may refer to:

 Latris, a Greek word meaning "slave"
 Latris, an island in the Bay of Kiel
 Latris (fish), a genus of fish in the family Latridae